Persatuan Sepakbola Demak Bersatu United (simply known as PSDB United) is an Indonesian football club based in Demak Regency, Central Java. They currently compete in the Liga 3.

References

External links

Football clubs in Indonesia
Football clubs in Central Java
Association football clubs established in 2021
2021 establishments in Indonesia